Trochoceras is a genus of trochoidally coiled nautiloid cephalopods placed in the nautilid family Rutoceratidae that lived during the Middle and Late Devonian in what is now central Europe.

The Trochoceras shell is a narrow, smooth, offset gyrocone consisting of little more than a single whorl, trochoidally grown in the sense of left hand screw. The phragmocone, with chambers, is ovate in cross section; the body or living chamber, quadrangular, with two pairs of winglike processes, one at the aperture and one at its base.  The siphuncle is ventral, segments fusiform.

Trochoceras resembles the rutoceratid Ptenoceras except the latter has a planar gyroconic shell with narrow projections extending laterally from the body chamber.

Species
 Trochoceras regale Barrande, 1848
 Trochoceras davidsoni Barrande
 Trochoceras baeri
 Trochoceras mccharlesi

References

 Bernhard Kummel, 1964. Nautiloidea -Nautilida. Treatise on Invertebrate Paleontology, Part K. Geological Soc. of America and Univ of Kansas press.
 Biolib
 Zipcodezoo
 Museum of Comparative Zoology – Harvard University

Prehistoric nautiloid genera
Middle Devonian first appearances
Late Devonian animals
Late Devonian genus extinctions
Prehistoric life of Europe
Paleozoic life of the Northwest Territories